Sir William Henry Bodkin (5 August 1791 – 26 March 1874) was a British barrister and Conservative Party politician who sat in the House of Commons from 1841 to 1847, before becoming a judge.

Early life 
Bodkin was the son of Peter Bodkin from Galway and his wife Sarah. His father's family had long connections with County Galway.

He was educated at the Islington Academy and called to the bar in 1826 at Gray's Inn.

Career 
Bodkin initially practised on the Home Circuit, taking mostly criminal cases at the Middlesex, Westminster and Kent Sessions, and in the Central Criminal Court in the Old Bailey. was appointed as a recorder of Dover in 1834.

He was elected at the 1841 general election as a Member of Parliament (MP) for the borough of Rochester in Kent, winning the seat by a margin of only two votes over the Liberal Party candidate Viscount Melgund. Bodkin was defeated at the 1847 general election as a result of his support for the free trade measures introduced by Sir Robert Peel. He did not stand at the 1852 general election, but unsuccessfully contested the borough at a by-election in February 1856.

He was knighted in 1867. He later became a Justice of the Peace (J.P) in Middlesex, and a Deputy Lieutenant of Middlesex, and judge of the Court of Sessions in Middlesex.

He was an active member of the Society of Arts, becoming its vice-president. He was president of the Highgate Literary and Scientific Institution and he wrote several pamphlets on the English Poor Laws.

Bodkin died aged 82 on 26 March 1874, after a long and painful illness. He was buried in the family grave at Highgate Cemetery

Personal life 
Bodkin lived at West Hill in Highgate, North London.

He married twice, first in 1812 to Sara Sophia Poland, who died in 1848, and then in 1865 to Sarah Constance Miles, the daughter of Joseph Johnson Miles, a J.P from Highgate. He had one son and one daughter. His son, William Henry Bodkin, succeeded him in several of his judging roles, and was the father of Sir Archibald Bodkin.

He is buried with his first wife.

References

External links 
 

1874 deaths
1791 births
Burials at Highgate Cemetery
Conservative Party (UK) MPs for English constituencies
UK MPs 1841–1847
Knights Bachelor
Members of Gray's Inn
19th-century English judges
People from Highgate
Deputy Lieutenants of Middlesex